Dulcinea (minor planet designation: 571 Dulcinea) is an asteroid orbiting in the inner main belt. It was named after Dulcinea, a character from Miguel de Cervantes' novel Don Quixote. This is classified as a stony S-type asteroid and it is the second largest member of the Erigone collisional family.

References

External links 
 
 

Erigone asteroids
000571
Discoveries by Paul Götz
Named minor planets
571 Dulcinea
000571
000571
000571
19050904